InstallJammer is a Microsoft Windows-style installer creator written in Tcl which creates self-extracting files that display an installation wizard. It is able to generate installers for versions of Microsoft Windows since Windows 98, FreeBSD, Linux (x86 and x64), Solaris, HP-UX and AIX.

As of August 16, 2011, InstallJammer has discontinued development.

References

External links

Installation software
Free installation software
Discontinued software